Damascus Historic District, is a national historic district located within Damascus Village in Damascus Township, Wayne County, Pennsylvania. The district includes 36 contributing buildings, 2 contributing sites, and 2 contributing structures in the community of Damascus.  The buildings are in a variety of popular architectural styles including Greek Revival, Queen Anne, and Renaissance Revival.  Notable buildings include the Baptist Church (c. 1832), Damascus Academy, Vail and Appley Store (c. 1860), Methodist Church (1857), Philip O'Reilly House (c. 1840), and Luther Appley House (c. 1850).  The sites are the Hillside Cemetery and Overlook Cemetery.

It was added to the National Register of Historic Places in 1992 by Dr. Brent D. Glass.

National Register of Historic Places Building Inventory

 Philip O'Reilly House
 Takace's Cottages
 Vail & Appley Store
 Sheard House
 Meckle's House
 Stephenson House
 White's House
 Olver House
 Abraham's House
 Tyler House
 Priebe's House
 Dr. Tyler House
 Dentist Office
 Damascus School
 Damascus Methodist
 Hillside Cemetery
 Tegeler House
 Berry House
 Gries House
 Burcher House
 Theobald House
 Tobias Pethick House
 Early House
 John Pethick
 Bush House
 Graby's House
 Damascus Baptist Church
 Overlook Cemetery
 Don Bush House
 Turner House
 Otto Appley House
 Luther Appley House
 Drake House

References

Historic districts on the National Register of Historic Places in Pennsylvania
Greek Revival architecture in Pennsylvania
Queen Anne architecture in Pennsylvania
Buildings and structures in Wayne County, Pennsylvania
National Register of Historic Places in Wayne County, Pennsylvania